Aymen Zidane (born 3 March 1983) is a Tunisian football goalkeeper.

References

1983 births
Living people
Tunisian footballers
Stade Tunisien players
EGS Gafsa players
AS Gabès players
Olympique Béja players
Association football goalkeepers
Tunisian Ligue Professionnelle 1 players
Footballers from Tunis